Paraccra chorogiae is a species of moth of the family Tortricidae. It is found in Kenya.

The wingspan is about 16 mm. The ground colour of the forewings is dark grey. The costa, apex and costal half of the termen pale orange, the costa with black dots. There are some red markings. The hindwings are dark brown.

Etymology
The species name refers to the type locality.

References

Endemic moths of Kenya
Moths described in 2012
Tortricini
Moths of Africa
Taxa named by Józef Razowski